The St. John's Street Railway Company was formed by Robert G. Reid in 1896 to build an electrical railway in St. John's to provide urban transportation using street cars.

The company was given the rights to build an electrical generating station at Petty Harbour and build a transmission line to St. John's from the Petty Harbour Generating Station. The power was 50-cycle power. The first street cars were from the Larivière Car Company out of Montreal, Quebec. The cars had a maximum capacity of 50 passengers and traveled at 8 miles per hour.

The streetcar system used the same narrow gauge as Reid's Newfoundland Railway.

St. John's streetcar system was built three years before the first automobile was imported into Newfoundland, a Rolls-Royce, owned by Reid.

In 1925 the Newfoundland Light and Power Company took ownership of the company. The cars were then changed out with cars from the Birney Car Company of Ottawa and could reach 20 miles per hour.

During World War II the public, and visiting sailors, relied on the streetcar system, as ownership of automobiles was confined to the wealthy, and the owners of taxis.

See also

 Newfoundland Railway
 Reid Newfoundland Company
 List of street railways in Canada

References

External links
 
 Newfoundland Railway - Newfoundland & Labrador Heritage
 The Reid Family: Newfoundland

Defunct electric power companies of Canada
Defunct Newfoundland and Labrador railways
History of St. John's, Newfoundland and Labrador
Companies based in St. John's, Newfoundland and Labrador
1896 establishments in Newfoundland
Railway companies established in 1896
Railway companies disestablished in 1925
1925 disestablishments in Newfoundland
Electric railways in Canada